Statistics of the Cambodian League for the 2000 season.

Overview
It was contested by 10 teams. The top four teams qualified to the Championship play-off and Nokorbal Cheat won the championship.

League standings

Championship play-off

Semi-finals
02 Dec 2000      Nokorbal Cheat         3-2     Sala Vekvoeun Yothes

09 Dec 2000     Kang Yothipoi KP       1-2     Keila Rith

Third place
16 Dec 2000 Sala Vekvoeun Yothes    3-1    Kang Yothipoi KP

Final
16 Dec 2000       Nokorbal Cheat         2-0    Kelia Rith

References
Cambodia - List of final tables (RSSSF)

C-League seasons
Cambodia
Cambodia
football